"Reality" is a single by the industrial hip-hop group Tackhead, released in January 1988 on On-U Sound Records.

Formats and track listing 
All songs written by Gary Clail, Keith LeBlanc, Skip McDonald, Adrian Sherwood and Doug Wimbish
UK 12" single (ON-U DP 19)
"Reality" – 5:55
"Life & Dreams" – 3:27

Personnel 

Tackhead
Gary Clail – vocals
Keith LeBlanc – drums, percussion
Skip McDonald – guitar
Adrian Sherwood – sampler, programming
Doug Wimbish – bass guitar

Technical personnel
Tackhead – producer

Charts

References

External links 
 

1988 songs
1988 singles
On-U Sound Records singles
Song recordings produced by Adrian Sherwood
Tackhead songs
Songs written by Doug Wimbish